Ángel Julián Serulle Ramia is a Dominican politician and lawyer. Serulle was one of six presidential candidates who contested the 2012 presidential election. Puig ran for president as a member of the Broad Front.

References

Dominican Republic politicians
21st-century Dominican Republic lawyers
Living people
Year of birth missing (living people)
Candidates for President of the Dominican Republic